Johann Hildebrandt may refer to:

 Johann Lukas von Hildebrandt (1668–1745), Austrian architect
 Johann Maria Hildebrandt (1847–1881), German explorer
 Johann Hildebrand (1614–1684), German composer
 Johann Gottfried Hildebrandt (1720s–1775), German organ builder